Aleurina ferruginea is a fungi in the Ascomycetes phyla commonly referred to as fleshy cup fungus. It is often found in litter, typically buried under a thick layer.

References 

Pyronemataceae